Sarsabz Metro Station is a station in Tehran Metro Line 2. It is located near Resalat Square. It is between Elm-o-Sanat University Metro Station and Janbazan Metro Station.

References

Tehran Metro stations